Jitendra Singh (born 6 November 1956) is an Indian physician and politician. He is the Minister of State (Independent Charge) for the Ministry of Science and Technology and Minister of state (Independent Charge) ministry of earth science and Minister of State for Prime Minister's Office; Personnel, Public Grievances and Pensions; Department of Atomic Energy and Department of Space.

He is a Bharatiya Janata Party (BJP) national executive member and was the chief spokesperson for the union territory of Jammu and Kashmir. He won the Udhampur seat in the Indian general election, 2014 and 2019 with highest ever margin of votes  for the 16th Lok Sabha and 17th Lok Sabha.

He was a professor of diabetes and endocrinology, Life Patron, Research Society for Study of Diabetes in India (RSSDI); Founder Executive Member, Diabetes in Pregnancy Study  India, a consultant, clinical practitioner, author of eight books, and a newspaper columnist. He is the ex-chairman for the National Scientific Committee Diabetes and the Research Society for the Study of Diabetes in India.

Early life
Singh was born on 6 November 1956 in Jammu, in the erstwhile Indian state of Jammu and Kashmir into a Hindu Dogra family to parents Rajinder Singh and Shanti Devi. His family belongs to Marmat area in Doda district. Jitendra is the eldest of three brothers.

Professional career
Besides being a medical doctor, Singh has also worked as a newspaper columnist. Initially he wrote for Kashmir Times. However, he was unhappy about how the newspaper covered events related to Kashmir. Subsequently, he switched to Daily Excelsior, which is the largest circulated newspaper of Jammu and Kashmir. His weekly column Tales of Travesty used to feature in the editorial section of the newspaper until his election to the Lok Sabha in 2014.

Political career

Formative years
In 2008, Singh was appointed spokesperson of the Shri Amarnathji Sangharsh Samiti, an umbrella organisation of right wing parties during the Amarnath land transfer controversy. During his stint with the organisation, he took premature retirement as a professor of endocrinology in the Government Medical College, Jammu to join the Bharatiya Janata Party in 2012. However, the party refused to make him a candidate for the 2009 Indian general election.

Parliamentary career
In March 2014, the party announced that Singh would contest the upcoming general election from Udhampur constituency in his native Jammu. His primary competitor was Ghulam Nabi Azad of the Indian National Congress party who was a former chief minister of the state. Singh was elected to the Lok Sabha after defeating Azad by a margin of 60,976 votes. Singh was polled  votes while Azad was polled  votes.

On 27 May 2014, Singh was appointed Minister of State in the Prime Minister's Office, Minister of State for Personnel, Public Grievances and Pensions, Minister of State for Department of Atomic Energy and Department of Space. He also became the Union Minister of State (Independent charge) in the Ministry of Science and Technology and Ministry of Earth Sciences.

In March 2019, the party renominated Singh as its candidate from the Udhampur constituency for the upcoming general election. His main rival was Vikramaditya Singh of the Congress party and supported by Jammu and Kashmir National Conference party. He is also the grandson of Hari Singh, the last monarch of the former princely state. Jitendra Singh fought the election on his "development report card". Notable campaigners for him included Prime Minister Narendra Modi, party president Amit Shah, Home Minister Rajnath Singh, Ram Madhav and cricketer Gautam Gambhir. Jitendra Singh was re-elected to the Lok Sabha after defeating Vikramaditya Singh by approximately 350,000 votes. Jitendra Singh was polled 7,15,406 votes compared to his rival's 3,66,123 votes.

On 31 May 2019, it was announced that Singh had retained his ministries in the Second Modi ministry.

Minister of Science and Technology

As a minister of science and technology, Singh launched India's first indigenously made research vessel named "Sindhu Sadhana" on 14 July 2014 from Mormugao harbour in Goa. In a written response to the Lok Sabha on 31 July, he announced that India had signed cooperative arrangements with 33 countries for "peaceful use of outer space". He further added that areas of co-operation included remote sensing of earth, launch services, satellite communication, telemetry, space exploration and space law. He further launched India's first home-made broad spectrum confocal microscope on 7 October at New Delhi. He announced that the government was considering increasing the retirement age of scientists to 62 years. The ministry increased the stipend of researchers by 50% at the end of the month. On 8 November 2014, Singh was replaced by Harsh Vardhan, another doctor as the minister of science and technology and earth sciences.

Minister of state in space and atomic energy

During Singh's ministership, the fourth Indian Regional Navigation Satellite System was launched by ISRO in April 2015 which would provide "navigation and communication facility to all the surrounding countries". On 29 April 2018, he along with ISRO chairman K. Sivan confirmed that India would send a crewed mission to the moon by 2022 as proposed by Prime Minister Modi.

Minister of state for Personnel, Public Grievances and pension

During Singh's tenure as the minister of personnel, public grievances and pension, the Union Public Service Commission refused to count the marks of English comprehension in the Civil Services Aptitude Test. This violated the status quo of the question paper as suggested by the Arvind Varma committee. Interviews were discontinued for lower tier government jobs as well the need of attestation by a gazetted officer was also discontinued. On 20 March 2019, Pinaki Chandra Ghose, a former Supreme Court judge was appointed as India's first Lokpal.

Minister of state for Development of North Eastern region

On 8 November 2014, in a cabinet reshuffle, Singh was appointed Minister of State (Independent charge) in the Ministry of Development of North Eastern Region and replaced V.K. Singh. In the ministry, he introduced the use of satellite imaging for surveying and building roads and for "preparation of utilisation certificates with fool-proof accuracy". He advised Sarbananda Sonowal, the Chief Minister of Assam to utilise the Assam Remote Sensing Application Centre to construct smart cities and in urban development. On 23 November 2015, Singh announced that the central government has decided to make Mizoram a "bamboo state" and the ministry proposed steps for the commercial utilisation of the state's bamboo potential.

In January 2016, he said that the Northeast India was "emerging destination for new Startups". In the Startup India scheme launched by Modi, the ministry added an additional incentive, "venture" funds. This fund would provide the aspiring entrepreneurs "relief from financial liabilities" and thus according to Singh, youth from other parts of India would "participate in the development of the North-Eastern States".

In September 2018, Pakyong Airport, Sikkim's first greenfield airport was inaugurated by Modi. Previously, Singh had set up a deadline of 2017. In the same month, he announced that an airport would also be built in Arunachal Pradesh.

2014 Jammu and Kashmir election
On 17 November 2014, the party announced that Singh was appointed the head of the 18-member Election Campaign Committee for the upcoming legislative assembly election in his native state. He formulated the strategy for the party. However, no party managed to get a majority in the election. The media speculated that Singh might become the Chief Minister of Jammu and Kashmir as he had the support of Narendra Modi and Amit Shah and was popular amongst the Hindus of Jammu. The party negotiated with Jammu and Kashmir National Conference party in order to form a coalition government. However, talks fell flat when the National Conference rejected the demand of a Hindu chief minister for which Singh was a front runner.

Political views
Singh said that the Article 370 of the Constitution of India, which gave a special status to the state of Jammu and Kashmir was temporary in nature and quoted India's first prime minister Jawaharlal Nehru for the same. He alleged that Congress and National Conference parties had fooled the people of the state "in the name of Article 370". He further criticised former chief minister Sheikh Abdullah for misusing the article to lengthen the term of the assembly.

Personal life
On 16 April 1982, Singh married Manju Singh. They have two sons.

References

 

Living people
Lok Sabha members from Jammu and Kashmir
Dogra people
India MPs 2014–2019
Indian medical researchers
Indian endocrinologists
People from Udhampur district
Union ministers of state of India
Union ministers of state of India with independent charge
Narendra Modi ministry
Ministry of Youth Affairs and Sports
Bharatiya Janata Party politicians from Jammu and Kashmir
Medical doctors from Jammu and Kashmir
India MPs 2019–present
1956 births